The 2017 CONMEBOL Libertadores de Beach Soccer was the second edition of the Copa Libertadores de Beach Soccer (known natively in Spanish as the Copa Libertadores de Futbol Playa), an annual continental beach soccer club tournament contested primarily between the champions of the domestic leagues of South American nations who are members of CONMEBOL.

The tournament was confirmed in December 2015 and was originally organised to take place in Santa Cruz, Bolivia.  However, due to "state interference" in the work of the Bolivian Football Federation (FBF), CONMEBOL decided to move the tournament to Lambare, Paraguay in October 2017.

The championship took place between 11 and 18 November in cooperation with the Paraguayan Football Association (APF), which saw an increase of the number of participating teams, up from nine in the first edition to twelve and an additional 12 matches.

Brazilians Vasco da Gama were the defending champions and successfully retained their title, beating Uruguayan side Malvín 8–5 in the final to secure their second Copa Libertadores crown.

Format
The tournament started with a group stage, played in a round robin format. The winners, runners-up and two best third placed teams from each group advanced to the knockout stage, in which the teams then competed in single-elimination matches, beginning with the quarter-finals and ending with the final. A third-place deciding match was also contested by the losing semi-finalists. The nations knocked out of title winning contention played in a series of consolation matches to decide fifth through twelfth place.

Teams
Twelve teams qualified to take part; each of the domestic league champions from the ten South American nations which are members of CONMEBOL, plus an additional club from the host country and the defending champions.

1. Vasco da Gama qualified as reigning champions. They were also domestic league champions. Therefore the Brazilian league runners-up, Sampaio Corrêa, took the Brazilian champions berth.
2. Garden club qualified as Paraguayan league champions. As the host country, Paraguay were awarded with a second berth which was given to the domestic league runners-up, Universidad Autónoma.

Venue

One venue was used in the city of Lambare, Gran Asunción.
An arena with a capacity of 3,000 at the Resort Yacht y Golf Club Paraguayo hosted the matches.

Squads
Each team had to submit a squad of 12 players, including a minimum of two goalkeepers (Regulations Article 3.1).

Referees
Sixteen officials were appointed by CONMEBOL on 1 November, instructed to arrive in Lambare by the 9th.

  Pablo Defelippi
  Dario Colombani
  Rolando Arteaga
  Juan Gutierrez
  Lucas Estevão
  Mayron dos Reis
  Victor Lara
  Juan Carlos Amaya
  Wilson Bravo
  Fabricio Quintero
  Silvio Coronel
  Jorge Martinez
  Ramon Blanco
  Alex Valdiviezo
  Andres Olivera
  Luis Eduardo Coy

Draw
The draw to split the twelve teams into three groups of four took place on November 3 in Asunción, Paraguay at the headquarters of the Paraguayan Football Association. The draw was conducted based on Regulations Article 6.3 as follows:

Initially, three teams were automatically assigned to the groups:

to Group A: runners-up and additional representatives of the host association,  Universidad Autónoma
to Group B: champions of the host association,  Garden Club
to Group C: 2016 Copa Libertadores de Beach Soccer champions,  Vasco da Gama

The remaining nine teams were split into three pots of three, shown in the below table.

The clubs were seeded based on the final placement of their national association's club in the previous edition of the championship, with the highest seeds placed in Pot 1 and lowest in Pot 3. From each pot, one team was drawn into Group A, one into B and one into C. Teams from the same association could not be drawn into the same group.

Group stage
The match schedule was revealed on 8 November.

Each team earns three points for a win in regulation time, two points for a win in extra time, one point for a win in a penalty shoot-out, and no points for a defeat. The top two teams of each group, plus the two best ranked third-placed teams, advance to the quarter-finals. The rankings of teams in each group are determined as follows (Regulations Article 6.2):

If two or more teams are equal on the basis of the above criterion, their rankings are determined as follows:

All times were local, PYST (UTC–3)

Group A

Group B

Group C

Ranking of third-placed teams

As per Regulations Article 6.1, it was decided the third place teams would take the following berths in the quarter-final draw:

9th–12th place play-offs
The teams finishing in fourth place and one unsuccessful third placed team were knocked out of title-winning contention, receding to play in consolation matches to determine 9th through 12th place in the final standings.

9th–12th place semi-finals

Ninth place play-off

Knockout stage
The group winners, runners-up and two best third placed teams progressed to the knockout stage to continue to compete for the title.

Quarter finals
The losers recede to play in consolation matches to determine 5th through 8th place in the final standings.

The winners proceed to continue to compete for the title.

Semi-finals

5th–8th place
The quarter final losers.

1st–4th place
The quarter final winners.

Finals

Fifth place play-off
The 5th–8th place semi-final winners.

Third place play-off
The 1st–4th place semi-final losers.

Championship final
The 1st–4th place semi-final winners.

Awards

Top goalscorers
Players with 6 or more goals

18 goals

 Carlos Carballo ( Garden Club)

13 goals

 Pedro Moran ( Universidad Autonoma)

11 goals

 Lucão ( Vasco da Gama)
 Serginho ( Sampaio Corrêa)

10 goals

 Alex Vaamonde ( Moraga Difalo)

9 goals

 Bruno Xavier ( Sampaio Corrêa)

8 goals

 Jesús Amado Rolón ( Universidad Autonoma)
 Catarino ( Vasco da Gama)

7 goals

 Bokinha ( Vasco da Gama)
 Daniel E Cedeño ( Defin Sporting)

6 goals

 Eudin ( Sampaio Corrêa)
 Felipe ( Sampaio Corrêa)
 Julio Zambrano ( Hamacas FC)
 Alberto Muñoz ( Moraga Difalo)

Source:APF

Final standings

Source

References

External links
Copa Libertadores Futbol Playa 2017 , at Beach Soccer Worldwide
Copa Libertadores 2017 , at beachsoccerrussia.ru (in Russian)

2017
Copa
2017
2017 in beach soccer
November 2017 sports events in South America
2017 in South American football